This is list of the protected areas of Uttar Pradesh, a northeastern state of India bordering Nepal.

National parks
There is only 1 national park located within Uttar Pradesh.

 Dudhwa National Park

Wildlife sanctuaries
There are total of 25 wildlife sanctuaries in Uttar Pradesh 
 Sarsai Nawar Wetland, Sarsai Nawar, Etawah district.
Bakhira Sanctuary, Sant Kabir Nagar district
Chandra Prabha Wildlife Sanctuary, Chandauli district
Hastinapur Wildlife Sanctuary, Amroha, Bijnor, Ghaziabad, Meerut, and Muzzafarnagar districts
Kachhua Sanctuary, Varanasi district
Kaimoor Sanctuary, Mirzapur and Sonbhadra districts
Katarniaghat Wildlife Sanctuary, Bahraich district
Kishanpur Wildlife Sanctuary, Lakhimpur Kheri district
Lakh Bahosi Sanctuary, Kannauj district
Mahavir Swami Sanctuary, Lalitpur district
National Chambal Wildlife Sanctuary, Agra and Etawah districts
Nawabganj Bird Sanctuary, Unnao district
Okhla Sanctuary, Ghaziabad, and Gautam Buddha Nagar districts
Parvati Arga Bird Sanctuary, Gonda district
Patna Bird Sanctuary, Etah district
Ranipur Sanctuary, Banda and Chitrakoot districts
Saman Sanctuary, Mainpuri district
Samaspur Sanctuary, Rae Bareli district
Sandi Bird Sanctuary, Hardoi district
Sohagi Barwa Sanctuary, Maharajganj district
Suhelva Sanctuary, Balrampur, Gonda, and Shravasti districts
Sur Sarovar Sanctuary, Agra district
Suraha Tal Sanctuary, Ballia district
Vijai Sagar Sanctuary, Mahoba district

Tiger Reserves
 Dudhwa Tiger Reserve is made up of
Dudhwa National Park
Kishanpur Wildlife Sanctuary, Lakhimpur Kheri district
Katarniaghat Wildlife Sanctuary, Bahraich district
Pilibhit Tiger Reserve, Pilibhit district
Amangarh Tiger Reserve, Bijnor district
Ranipur Tiger Reserve, Chitrakoot district

Safari Park
Etawah Safari Park, Etawah

See also
Allen Forest Zoo
Lucknow Zoo

References

2. https://wii.gov.in/nwdc_national_parks

External links
 http://www.up-tourism.com/destination/wildlife/wildlife.htm

 https://wii.gov.in/nwdc_national_parks

 
P
U
Protected areas of Uttar Pradesh